Empress Feng (died 23 February 499), formally Empress You (幽皇后, literally "the lonely empress"), was an empress of the Xianbei-led Chinese Northern Wei dynasty. She was the second empress of Emperor Xiaowen.

Early life
It is not known when Lady Feng was born. She was a daughter of Feng Xi (馮熙) the Prince of Changli, who was a brother of the powerful Grand Empress Dowager Feng, the wife of Emperor Wencheng and regent over his son Emperor Xianwen and grandson Emperor Xiaowen.  (Through her father, she was therefore also a great-granddaughter of the Northern Yan emperor Feng Hong.)  Her mother was Feng Xi's concubine Lady Chang.  When she was 13, Grand Empress Dowager Feng selected her and a sister of hers to be Emperor Xiaowen's concubines. Both were favored by Emperor Xiaowen, but her sister soon died of an illness, and she herself grew ill (maybe of smallpox) and was sent back to her home.  She subsequently became a Buddhist nun, but was said to have been sexually immoral during this timespan as well.

On 19 May 493, Lady Feng's younger sister by a different mother (probably Feng Xi's wife Princess Boling), the future Empress Xiaowenfei, became Emperor Xiaowen's empress.  Subsequently, Emperor Xiaowen, perhaps through Empress Xiaowenfei, found out that Lady Feng had recovered from her illness, and took her back into the palace as an imperial consort, with the title Zhaoyi of the Left (左昭儀).  She became Emperor Xiaowen's favorite again.  Because Feng Zhaoyi was Emperor Xiaowen's concubine earlier and was an older sister, she refused to submit to Empress Xiaowenfei and tried to undermine Empress Xiaowenfei's position as an empress, including accusing Empress Xiaowenfei of disobeying Emperor Xiaowen's Sinicization regime. In August 496, Emperor Xiaowen deposed Empress Xiaowenfei. On 22 August 497, he created Feng Zhaoyi empress.

Empress
Because Emperor Xiaowen often spent his time on the frontlines battling rival Southern Qi, he was not often at the palace in the capital Luoyang. Empress Feng therefore carried on an affair with her attendant Gao Pusa (高菩薩).  With the eunuch Shuang Meng (雙蒙) protecting her, few knew or dared to say anything about the affair. When her attendant Ju Peng (劇彭) tried to counsel her to stop the affair, she would not, and Ju died in fear and anger.  At the same time, however, Empress Feng tried to force Emperor Xiaowen's sister Princess Pengcheng (who had been widowed after the death of her husband Liu Chengxu (劉承緒), to marry her brother Feng Su (馮夙).  Emperor Xiaowen approved of the marriage; as Princess Pengcheng was unwilling to marry Feng Su, she escaped from Luoyang and sought out Emperor Xiaowen at the frontline, revealing to him Empress Feng's affair with Gao.  Emperor Xiaowen was initially unwilling to believe the accusation and kept it secret. But, Empress Feng became nervous and, along with her mother Lady Chang, engaged witches to try to curse Emperor Xiaowen, who was already ill by this time, to death.

However, Emperor Xiaowen did not die, and after he returned to Luoyang in 499, he interrogated Gao and Shuang, and both admitted.  He then summoned Empress Feng and confronted her with Gao and Shuang's testimony—at an interrogation that no one else other than himself was at.  After he finished the interrogation, he then summoned his brothers Yuan Xie the Prince of Pengcheng and Yuan Xiang (元詳) the Prince of Beihai, stating to them, "She used to be your sister-in-law, but treat her now as a passerby, and you need not avoid her."  (By traditional Chinese custom, a brother-in-law and a sister-in-law may not sit together or speak with each other.)  Emperor Xiaowen then stated, "This woman wanted to stick a knife in my ribs.  Because she is a daughter of Empress Dowager Wenming's clan, I cannot depose her, but I hope that one day she will find her conscience and kill herself.  Do not believe that I have any remaining feelings for her."  After the two princes exited, Emperor Xiaowen gave her a final goodbye, indicating that he would not see her again.  The concubines still greeted her as empress, but Emperor Xiaowen ordered his crown prince Yuan Ke not to see her again as well.  When Emperor Xiaowen sent eunuchs to give her instructions on certain matters, she rebuked the eunuchs, stating that she was an empress and would not take instructions from eunuchs.  In anger, Emperor Xiaowen sent a cane to her mother Lady Chang, and Lady Chang was forced to cane Empress Feng herself as punishment.

Death
Later that year, Emperor Xiaowen grew seriously ill, and he left instructions to Yuan Xie to force Empress Feng to commit suicide after his own death, but to still bury her with imperial honors to avoid shame to the Feng clan.  He then died, and Yuan Xie sent the palace official Bai Zheng (白整) to give her poison.  Empress Feng refused to drink the poison, stating, "My husband did not make such an order! It is the princes who want to kill me."  Bai seized her physically and forced poisonous peppers into her mouth, and she died. She was buried with imperial honors together with her husband.

References 

 Book of Wei, vol. 13.
 History of Northern Dynasties, vol. 13.
 Zizhi Tongjian, vols. 140, 141, 142

Northern Wei empresses
499 deaths
Northern Wei Buddhists
Chinese Buddhist nuns
5th-century Buddhist nuns
Year of birth unknown